Bartra is a Catalan surname. Notable people with the surname include:

Agustí Bartra (1908–1982), Catalan poet, writer, and translator
Marc Bartra (born 1991), Spanish footballer
Roger Bartra (born 1942), Mexican sociologist and anthropologist

Catalan-language surnames